is a retired Nippon Professional Baseball pitcher. He played for the Hanshin Tigers and the Chiba Lotte Marines.

External links

Living people
1970 births
Baseball people from Aichi Prefecture
Chiba Lotte Marines players
Hanshin Tigers players
Japanese baseball players
Nippon Professional Baseball infielders